Río Bravo, or Río Bravo del Norte, is the name given in Mexico to the river known in the United States as the Rio Grande.

Río Bravo may also refer to:
 Kern River, California, original Spanish name, Rio Bravo de San Felipe
 Río Bravo, Tamaulipas, Mexico
 Río Bravo, Suchitepéquez, Guatemala
 Rio Bravo (former settlement), California, U.S. on the Kern River, later named Panama
 Rio Bravo, Texas, U.S.
 Rio Bravo, California, U.S., an unincorporated community
 Rio Bravo (film), a 1959 American western
 Rio Bravo Conservation and Management Area, a nature reserve in Belize
 Rio Bravo Cantina, a defunct American Tex-Mex restaurant chain
 Rio Bravo, a tributary of the Hondo River in Belize, also known as Chan Chich